Sour gum can refer to:

Black tupelo (Nyssa sylvatica), a medium-sized deciduous tree occasionally referred to as "sourgum".
Water tupelo, a long-lived tupelo tree occasionally referred to as "sourgum".
Sour gum, a sour type of chewing gum.